Mato may refer to:

People
Ana Mato (born 1959), Spanish politician
Jakup Mato (1934–2005), Albanian publicist
Mato Miloš (born 1993), Croatian footballer
Mato Neretljak (born 1979), Croatian footballer

Places
Mato, a parish of Ponte de Lima, Portugal
Matorral, Portuguese scrublands formed on Cambrian schists
Mato Grosso, a state in western Brazil
Mato Grosso do Sul, a state in western Brazil
Mato Paha, the Lakotaname for Bear Butte, South Dakota

Other uses
MAŤO, the Slovak 8-bit personal computer
Matō, the surname of several characters in the visual novel Fate/stay night
Matō Station, a railway station in Nikkō, Tochigi Prefecture, Japan
Mató cheese, a Catalan cheese
Mato music, a type of Bushee Negro music
Mato language, Austronesian language of Papua New Guinea

See also
Matos (disambiguation)
Matos (surname)